The White Sands Pupfish were a professional baseball team based in Alamogordo, New Mexico. The team was a member of the Pecos League, an independent baseball league which is not affiliated with Major or Minor League Baseball. They were originally known as the Coastal Kingfish and played in the Continental Baseball League. For the 2009 season, the Kingfish was a traveling team without a home ballpark. In early April 2010, the Coastal Kingfish replaced the West Texas Road Hogs as the CBL travel team. The Kingfish joined the Pecos League in 2011 as the White Sands Pupfish, and relocated to Alamogordo, New Mexico.

Team record 
 2011  41-29
 2012  27-42
 2013  26-43
 2014  28-33
 2015  37-28
 2016  28-39
 2017  13-50
 2018    7-51
  2019     8-49

Single-season records

Individual

Batting
 Games:  Eric Kalbfliesh, 66 (2016)
 Batting Average:  Ernie Munoz, .427 (2011)
 At Bats:  Cody Collins, 276 (2013)
 Hits:  Eric Kalbfliesh, 115 (2016)
 Runs:  Austin Newell, 78 (2012)
 Doubles:  Cody Collins, 24 (2013)
 Triples:  Aaron Olivas, Aaron Nardone, 8 (2015)
 Home Runs: Henry Gonzalez Jr., 17 (2012)
 RBI:  TJ Wharton, 67 (2016)
 Walks:  Brandon Torres, 46 (2017, 2018)
 Strikeouts:  Robert Rodriguez, 74 (2011)
 Stolen Bases:  Dabal Baez, 21 (2016)
 Caught Stealing:  Aaron Olivas, 7 (2015)

Pitching
 Wins:  Cameron Powers, 8 (2015)
 Loses:  Joseph Johnson, 9 (2018)
 Saves:  Garrett McKenzie, 5 (2017)
 Games Started:  Anthony Pastrana, Nick Bozeman, 14 (2016)
 Games:  Chris Stout, 40 (2016)
 Innings Pitched:  Eric Zagar, 76.2 (2013)
 Hits Allowed:  Cameron Powers, 107 (2015)
 Runs Allowed:  Joseph Johnson, 100 (2018)
 Earned Runs Allowed:  Joseph Johnson, 80 (2018)
 Strikeouts:  Anthony Pastrana, 82 (2016)
 Walks Allowed:  Joseph Johnson, 53 (2018)

Single season team records 
 Wins:  41 (2011)
 Loses:  51 (2018)

Managers 
Keith Essary, 2011 (41-29)
Mickey Speaks, 2015-2016 (65-67). Winningest manager all-time.
Chris Stout,  2016-2017
Cameron Haskins, 2018
Matt Chambers, 2019

Notable alumni

 Yermín Mercedes (2014)
 Chris Smith (2011)

External links
 White Sands Pupfish official website

Pecos League teams
Professional baseball teams in New Mexico
Alamogordo, New Mexico
2011 establishments in New Mexico
Baseball teams established in 2009
Defunct independent baseball league teams
Defunct baseball teams in New Mexico